The 2010 AFC Champions League Final was a football match which was played on Saturday, 13 November 2010. It was the 29th final of the AFC Champions League. The match was played at the National Stadium in Tokyo and was contested by Seongnam Ilhwa Chunma of South Korea and Zob Ahan from Iran. For Seongnam this was the fourth appearance in the final of the main AFC tournament, after two consecutive Asian Club Championship finals in 1996 and 1997 and AFC Champions League final in 2004, with one trophy been won in 1996. Zob Ahan was a debutant of the final stage.

The winners entered the quarterfinals of the 2010 FIFA Club World Cup.

Seongnam won 3–1 to clinch the title.

Qualified teams

Road to Tokyo

Match details

See also
2010 AFC Champions League
2010 FIFA Club World Cup

References

External links
Official site

Final
2010
AFC Champions League Final
AFC Champions League Final
2010 in Japanese football
2010